The 2022 South Carolina Gamecocks baseball team represents the University of South Carolina in the 2022 NCAA Division I baseball season. The 2022 season marks the Gamecocks' 129th overall. The Gamecocks play their home games at Founders Park, and are led by fifth year head coach Mark Kingston.

Previous season

The Gamecocks finished 34–23, 16–14 in the SEC, losing in the Columbia Regional to Virginia.

Personnel

Roster

Coaching staff

Schedule and results

Standings

Results

Rankings

See also
2022 South Carolina Gamecocks softball team

References

South Carolina
South Carolina Gamecocks baseball seasons
South Carolina Gamecocks baseball